A. K. Saseendran (born 29 January 1946) is an Indian politician serving as the Minister for Forests, Wild Life Protection, Government of Kerala in the second Pinarayi Vijayan ministry. He belongs to the Nationalist Congress Party and represents the Elathur constituency. He was previously elected to the Kerala Legislative Assembly in 1980, 1982, 2006, 2011 and 2016.

Personal life

He is the son of K. Kunhambu and M. K. Janaki. He was born in Kannur on 29 January 1946. He is married to Anitha Krishnan N T and has one son Varun Saseendran. He resides at Mele Chovva, Kannur.

Hobbies : Reading and Travelling

Recreation : Watching Football

Political life 
One among the senior leaders in Kerala politics. A native of Elayavoor in Kannur, Saseendran started his political career through KSU in 1962. After holding various party posts, he joined Congress (S) in 1978. Later he joined NCP and currently he is a member of national working committee since 2006.
He was elected to the Assembly in 1980 from Peringalam, 1982 from Edakkad, 2006 from Balussery and three times consecutively from Elathur during 2011,2016 and 2021 elections.

Positions held 
 President, District Committee, Kerala Students Union Kozhikode (1963–66)
 General Secretary, Kerala Students Union (1967–69)
 General Secretary (1969–77)
 Vice President (1969–78) and President (1978-80)
 Kerala Pradesh Youth Congress Committee (1978–80)
 Member, Coffee Board (1978–80)
 ISCUS (1977–81)
 Governing Board of Kerala Saksharata Samiti (1987-91 & 1992-97)
 Kerala State Housing Board (1997-2001)
 Vice-President, Jawaharlal Nehru Public Library and Research Centre, Kannur 
 General Secretary, Congress (U) & Indian Congress Socialist (Congress(S))
 Member, Advisory Committee, Food Corporation of India
 State General Secretary, State Vice President, National Committee Member, Working Committee Member and Parliamentary Party leader of Nationalist Congress Party (N.C.P.)
 Kerala Legislative Assembly; Minister for Transport (from 25-5-2016 to 27-3-2017 and 01-2-2018 to 03-05-2021)
 Kerala Legislative Assembly; Minister for Forests, Wild Life Protection (from 20-5-2021)

Controversy 
On 26 March 2017, Saseendran resigned as minister after a newly launched malayalam television channel, Mangalam TV, aired a telephonic audio clip in which he is allegedly heard speaking in a sexually explicit way to a person, whom the channel claimed was a housewife.

Later, the channel CEO apologised and admitted that it was a sting operation done using a woman journalist of the channel after having denied it earlier.

On April 4, the CEO and four mediapersons of the channel were arrested by the police for airing “obscene conversation” and criminal conspiracy.

Later, Saseendran was acquitted in the case after the complainant, who had earlier alleged sexual harassment turned hostile in court and he returned as minister. Saseendran was the second Minister to resign from the Pinarayi Vijayan Cabinet.

References 

Members of the Kerala Legislative Assembly
1946 births
Nationalist Congress Party politicians from Kerala
Living people
Politicians from Kozhikode
Politicians from Kannur
Indian National Congress (U) politicians
Indian National Congress politicians